Beaty-Little House is an historic home located at Conway in Horry County, South Carolina. It was built about 1855 and is a two-story, rectangular, central hall plan residence with a hipped roof and two interior brick chimneys. It features a full-width, hipped-roof porch across the front façade with freestanding Tuscan-influenced columns and an elaborately sawn balustrade.

It was listed on the National Register of Historic Places in 1986.

References

External links
Beaty--Little House - Conway, South Carolina - U.S. National Register of Historic Places on Waymarking.com

Houses on the National Register of Historic Places in South Carolina
Houses completed in 1855
Houses in Horry County, South Carolina
National Register of Historic Places in Horry County, South Carolina
Buildings and structures in Conway, South Carolina